The Liga Sudamericana de Básquetbol MVP, or FIBA South American League MVP, is an annual basketball award, that is given by the professional South American second-tier level Liga Sudamericana de Básquetbol (LSB), which is commonly known as the FIBA South American League, to its Most Valuable Player of each league season. The award began with the league's inaugural 1996 season. The first award winner was Jorge Racca. The player with the most awards won so far is Guilherme Giovannoni, whom won the award twice, in 2010 and 2013.

List of winners

Players with multiple MVPs won

See also
Basketball Champions League Americas
FIBA Americas League
FIBA Americas League Grand Final MVP
FIBA South American League

References

External links
Liga Sudamericana Official Website
LatinBasket.com Liga Sudamericana

South America
MVP